The Jordan national rugby team represents Jordan in international rugby union. They have yet to make their debut at the Rugby World Cup.

Jordan played their first test match against  on May 14, 2010, in Dubai. Despite losing 27-8 they won the Division 4 title of the 2010 HSBC Asian Five Nations.

Record

Overall

See also
Jordan Rugby
 Jordan Rugby website

References

External links and references
 Jordan Rugby official site
 Jordan on rugbydata.com

Asian national rugby union teams
Rugby union in Jordan
National sports teams of Jordan